Shirley Myers is a Canadian country music singer-songwriter. Signed to Stony Plain Records in the 1990s, she released released her debut album, Let It Rain, in 1997. The first single, the title track, reached the top five of the RPM Country Singles chart in Canada. Myers was nominated for a Juno Award for Best Country Female Vocalist in 1998.

Discography

Albums

Singles

Music videos

Notes

References

Canadian women singer-songwriters
Canadian singer-songwriters
Canadian women country singers
Living people
Year of birth missing (living people)